Otterville is an incorporated town in Jersey County, Illinois, United States. As of the 2020 census, the town had a total population of 87.

Geography
Otterville is located at  (39.051073, -90.397601).

Demographics

As of the census of 2000, there were 120 people, 41 households, and 33 families residing in the town. The racial makeup of the town was 96.67% White, 1.67% Native American, and 1.67% from two or more races. Hispanic or Latino of any race were 2.50% of the population.

There were 41 households, out of which 41.5% had children under the age of 18 living with them, 65.9% were married couples living together, 9.8% had a female householder with no husband present, and 19.5% were non-families. 17.1% of all households were made up of individuals, and 4.9% had someone living alone who was 65 years of age or older. The average household size was 2.93 and the average family size was 3.36.

In the town, the population was spread out, with 34.2% under the age of 18, 5.8% from 18 to 24, 26.7% from 25 to 44, 25.0% from 45 to 64, and 8.3% who were 65 years of age or older. The median age was 34 years. For every 100 females, there were 84.6 males. For every 100 females age 18 and over, there were 92.7 males.

The median income for a household in the town was $34,063, and the median income for a family was $34,375. Males had a median income of $33,000 versus $16,000 for females. The per capita income for the town was $10,588. There were 14.7% of families and 14.6% of the population living below the poverty line, including 19.4% of under eighteens and none of those over 64.

Notable people 

 John B. Hamilton, (1847–1898) served as the U.S. Surgeon General from 1879 to 1891
 Stephen V. White, (1831–1913) US congressman from New York

History
Otterville is the home of the first free integrated school in the United States, the Hamilton Primary School, located on Main Street. In 1834, Dr. Silas Hamilton, a local physician, left $4,000 for the construction and operation of a building for educational and religious purposes. A stone-built school was opened in 1836, and the tuition-free education for local students attracted families to the area. The school was razed in 1872, and was rebuilt and enlarged, with the original stones at the base. Classes were held at the school until 1971. George Washington, a slave freed by Dr. Hamilton, studied here, became successful, and established a perpetual scholarship fund for Americans of African descent. He also provided for the erection of a monument to his former master at the school.

The school was placed on the National Register of Historic Places in 1998.

References

1867 establishments in Illinois
Populated places established in 1867
Towns in Jersey County, Illinois
Towns in Illinois